The superpredator myth, known by its proponents as the superpredator theory, was a theory in criminology that became popular the 1990s in the United States, positing that a small but significant and increasing population of impulsive (often urban) youth were willing to commit violent crimes without remorse. John J. DiIulio Jr., the criminologist and political scientist who came up with the idea, predicted a large increase in youth crime and violence due to superpredators. American lawmakers seized on this idea, and implemented tough-on-crime legislation for juvenile offenders across the country, including life without parole sentences.

The theory was criticized when crime significantly decreased in the following years. Dilulio has since retracted some of his ideas. There are many alternative explanations to the rise in crime until the 1990s and the subsequent drop. One explanation is the lead–crime hypothesis, which says that the use of leaded gasoline could have caused the high crime rates in the 1980s and 90s. Kevin Drum, an American journalist, argued that the "superpredators" that Dilulio described as impulsive, violent, and conscienceless may have actually had lead poisoning. The theory was also criticized as many people believed the theory was used to justify disproportionate sentencing of African-American children.

A Miami University study of United States media coverage of the 1999 Columbine High School massacre suggested that it reinforced the superpredator theory, especially with "alarmist responses to erroneous fears about growing rates and severity of youth violence".

References 

Criminology
1990s neologisms
Crime in the United States
Moral panic
Youth in the United States
Juvenile delinquency